Hans Francisco Salinas Flores (born 23 April 1990) is a Chilean footballer that currently plays for  club Deportes Iquique as left midfielder.

External links
 
 
 Hans Salinas at Football-Lineups

1990 births
Living people
Chilean footballers
Chile youth international footballers
Chilean Primera División players
Primera B de Chile players
Cobresal footballers
Deportes Concepción (Chile) footballers
Deportes La Serena footballers
Deportes Iquique footballers
Association football midfielders